The canton of Saint-Sébastien-sur-Loire is an administrative division of the Loire-Atlantique department, western France. It was created at the French canton reorganisation which came into effect in March 2015. Its seat is in Saint-Sébastien-sur-Loire.

It consists of the following communes:
Basse-Goulaine
Haute-Goulaine
Saint-Sébastien-sur-Loire

References

Cantons of Loire-Atlantique